Val Polcevera is one of the main valleys crossing Genoa, taking its name from the eponymous river. It is one of two valleys bordering the historic core of the city, along with Val Bisagno.

External links
 

Genoa
Valleys of Liguria
Metropolitan City of Genoa